Enz of an Era was a compilation by New Zealand rock band Split Enz. Released to mark the band's 10th anniversary, and composed of tracks selected by members of the band, the album was released in New Zealand and Australia only. The album was followed up by two "Enz Of An Era" 10th anniversary concerts in early 1983.

Track listing
 "History Never Repeats" from Waiata, 1981 2:58 (Neil Finn)
 "My Mistake" from Dizrythmia, 1977 3:00 (Tim Finn/Eddie Rayner)
 "I Got You" from True Colours, 1980 3:29 (Neil Finn)
 "Late Last Night" from Second Thoughts, 1976 4:03 (Phil Judd)
 "Poor Boy" from True Colours, 1980 3:27 (Tim Finn)
 "Dirty Creature" from Time and Tide, 1982 4:01 (Tim Finn/Nigel Griggs/Neil Finn)
 "I See Red" from Frenzy, 1978 3:15 (Tim Finn)
 "Six Months in a Leaky Boat" (7" single edit) from Time and Tide, 1982 3:49 (Tim Finn/Split Enz)
 "One Step Ahead" from Waiata, 1980 2:51 (Neil Finn)
 "Matinee Idyll (129)" from Second Thoughts, 1976 2:57 (Phil Judd/Tim Finn)
 "Another Great Divide" single, 1977 3:38 (Phil Judd/Tim Finn/Eddie Rayner/Robert Gillies)
 "Bold as Brass" from Dizrythmia, 1977 3:29 (Tim Finn/Robert Gillies)
 "I Hope I Never" from True Colours, 1980 4:33 (Tim Finn)
 "Give It a Whirl" from Frenzy, 1979 2:52 (Tim Finn/Neil Finn)

Personnel
Split Enz

Second Thoughts and "Another Great Divide"
Tim Finn - Vocals, Piano
Phil Judd - Vocals, Guitar
Mike Chunn - Bass
Eddie Rayner - Keyboards
Emlyn Crowther - Drums
Noel Crombie – Percussion
Rob Gillies - Saxophone, Trumpet 
Dizrythmia
Tim Finn - Vocals, Piano
Eddie Rayner - Keyboards
Noel Crombie – Percussion
Rob Gillies - Saxophone, Trumpet 
Malcolm Green – Drums
Neil Finn – Vocals, Guitar
Nigel Griggs – Bass
Frenzy, True Colours and Waiata
Tim Finn - Vocals, Piano
Eddie Rayner - Keyboards
Noel Crombie – Percussion
Malcolm Green – Drums
Neil Finn – Vocals, Guitar
Nigel Griggs – Bass
Time and Tide
Tim Finn - Vocals, Piano
Eddie Rayner - Keyboards
Noel Crombie – Drums, Percussion
Neil Finn – Vocals, Guitar
Nigel Griggs – Bass

Charts

Weekly charts

Year-end charts

Certifications and sales

References

1982 compilation albums
Split Enz compilation albums
Mushroom Records compilation albums